Kendrapara Lok Sabha Constituency is one of the 21 Lok Sabha (Parliamentary) Constituencies in Odisha state in Eastern India.

Assembly segments
Assembly Constituencies which constitute this Parliamentary Constituency, after delimitation of Parliamentary Constituencies and Legislative Assembly Constituencies of 2008 are:

Assembly Constituencies which constituted this Parliamentary Constituency, before delimitation of Parliamentary Constituencies and Legislative Assembly Constituencies of 2008 are:
Aul, Pattamundai, Rajnagar, Kendrapara, Patkura, Kisannagar and Mahanga

Members of Parliament
Elected members from the Kendrapara constituency are

 2019: Anubhav Mohanty, Biju Janata Dal
2014: Baijayant Panda, Biju Janata Dal, later independent (resigned on 14 June 2018)
2009: Baijayant Panda, Biju Janata Dal
2004: Archana Nayak, Biju Janata Dal
1999: Prabhat Kumar Samantaray, Biju Janata Dal
1998: Prabhat Kumar Samantaray, Biju Janata Dal
1996: Srikant Kumar Jena, Janata Dal
1991: Rabi Ray, Janata Dal
1989: Rabi Ray, Janata Dal
1985 bye-poll: Sarat Kumar Deb, Janata Party (bye election)
1984: Biju Patnaik, Janata Party
1980: Biju (Bijayananda) Patnaik, Janata Party (Secular)
1977: Biju Patnaik, Janata Party
1971: Surendra Mohanty, Utkal Congress
1967: Surendranath Dwivedy, Praja Socialist Party
1962: Surendranath Dwivedy, Praja Socialist Party
1957: Surendranath Dwivedy, Praja Socialist Party
 1952: Nityanand Kanungo, Congress

Election Result

General Election 2019

General election 2014
In 2014 election, Biju Janata Dal candidate Baijayant Panda defeated Indian National Congress candidate Dharanidhar Nayak by a margin of 2,09,108 votes.

General Election 2009

References

Lok Sabha constituencies in Odisha
Kendrapara district
Cuttack district